Andrian Negai (born 28 January 1985 in Chișinău) is a Moldovan international footballer who currently plays for FC Milsami Orhei.

External links
 
 Profile at FC Milsami Orhei
 
 
 
 

1985 births
Footballers from Chișinău
Moldovan footballers
Living people
Association football goalkeepers
Moldova international footballers
FC Zimbru Chișinău players
FC Milsami Orhei players